Kontakto is an Esperanto magazine published by TEJO and supported by the Universal Esperanto Association (UEA). The magazine has readers in about 90 countries of the world. It started in 1963 through a proposal of the UEA committee by Humphrey Tonkin, who became its first editor in chief and who provided a magazine that touched on topics of interest to Esperanto youth. The magazine often used the slogan "In Esperanto, but not about Esperanto."

In the early 1980s, Anna Lowenstein became the editor. Her contributions to the magazine included easy-to-read articles, which concerned serious topics, but were written in simple language suitable for beginning Esperanto learners.

List of editors 
Humphrey Tonkin
Stefan Maul
Simo Milojevic
Giorgio Silfer (1975–1977)
Jouko Lindstedt (1978)
Giulio Cappa (1978–1979)
Dario Besseghini 
Anna Lowenstein
Leif Nordenstorm
Francisco Javier Moleón (1990)
István Ertl (1990–1991)
Francisco Veuthey (1992–1998)
Sabira Stahlberg (1998–2001)
Yevgenia Amis (Ĵenja Zvereva Amis) (2002–2007)
Pavel Mozhayev (2007–2010)
Rogener Pavinski (starting in 2010)

References

External links
Official website of Kontakto (in Esperanto)
The "Kontakto" page at the site "Gazetejo.org" (in Esperanto)
Information about Kontakto from esperanto.org (in Esperanto)

1963 establishments in the Netherlands
Esperanto magazines
Magazines established in 1963
Mass media in Rotterdam
Monthly magazines published in the Netherlands